The 2022–23 season is the 141st season in the existence of Stockport County Football Club and the club's first season back in League Two. In addition to the league, they will also compete in the 2022–23 FA Cup, the 2022–23 EFL Cup and the 2022–23 EFL Trophy.

Transfers

In

Out

Loans in

Loans out

Pre-season and friendlies
On May 23, County announced their first three pre-season friendlies, against Nuneaton Borough, Chorley and Curzon Ashton. A week later a fourth fixture, against Altrincham was confirmed. Also included was a behind-closed-doors friendly against Bolton Wanderers.

Competitions

Overall record

League Two

League table

Results summary

Results by round

Matches

On 23 June, the league fixtures were announced.

FA Cup

County were drawn at home to Swindon Town in the first round, away to Charlton Athletic in the second round and at home again to Walsall in the third round.

EFL Cup

Stockport County were drawn away to Harrogate Town in the first round and at home to Leicester City in the second round.

EFL Trophy

On 20 June, the initial Group stage draw was made, grouping Stockport County with Shrewsbury Town and Port Vale. Three days later, Wolverhampton Wanderers U21s joined Northern Group C.

Goalscorers
1 goal
 Callum Camps
 Connor Jennings
 Paddy Madden
 Antoni Sarcevic
 Kyle Wootton

References

2022-23
2022–23 EFL League Two by team